Alberto Rodríguez Baró (born 10 September 1997), commonly known as Tachi, is a Spanish professional footballer who plays as a central defender for Polish club Wisła Kraków.

Club career
Born in Fuenlabrada, Madrid, Tachi joined Atlético Madrid's youth setup in 2013, from Getafe CF. Promoted to the reserves ahead of the 2016–17 season, he made his senior debut on 28 August 2016 by starting in a 1–0 Tercera División away win against Fútbol Alcobendas Sport.

Tachi scored his senior goal on 7 May 2017, netting the opener in a 3–1 away defeat of AD Parla. He contributed with 33 appearances during his first campaign, as his side achieved promotion to Segunda División B.

On 19 July 2019, after being a regular starter for Atleti's B-side, Tachi signed a four-year contract with La Liga side Deportivo Alavés. He made his professional debut on 18 August, coming on as a late substitute for fellow debutant Luis Rioja in a 1–0 home defeat of Levante UD.

On 26 January 2022, after featuring rarely, Tachi moved to hometown side CF Fuenlabrada on loan for the remainder of the 2021–22 Segunda División season. On 31 August, he terminated his contract with the Babazorros.

After staying unemployed throughout the rest of 2022, on 20 January 2023 Tachi joined Polish I liga side Wisła Kraków on a deal until June 2024.

Career statistics

Club

References

External links

1997 births
Living people
People from Fuenlabrada
Spanish footballers
Footballers from the Community of Madrid
Association football defenders
La Liga players
Segunda División players
Segunda División B players
Tercera División players
Atlético Madrid B players
Deportivo Alavés players
CF Fuenlabrada footballers
Wisła Kraków players
Spanish expatriate footballers
Expatriate footballers in Poland
Spanish expatriate sportspeople in Poland